Grosley-sur-Risle (literally Grosley on Risle) is a commune just outside Beaumont-le-Roger in the Eure department in northern France. It has the river Risle running through it.

Population

See also
Communes of the Eure department

References

External links

Gazetteer Entry

Communes of Eure